In the U.S. state of Connecticut, state highways are grouped into signed routes, unsigned special service roads (SSR), and unsigned state roads (SR). Special service roads are roads that connect a federal or state facility (including state parks and some Interstate Highway interchanges) to a signed state route. Roads classified by the Connecticut Department of Transportation as special service roads are given an unsigned number designation between 400 and 1001.

See also
List of State Routes in Connecticut

References

External links
 http://www.kurumi.com/roads/ct/secretlist.html

Special service
Special service roads